Macropod hybrids are hybrids of animals within the family Macropodidae, which includes kangaroos and wallabies. Several macropod hybrids have been experimentally bred, including:

Some hybrids between similar species have been achieved by housing males of one species and females of the other together to limit the choice of a mate. To create a "natural" macropod hybrid, young animals of one species have been transferred to the pouch of another so as to imprint into them the other species. In-vitro fertilization has also been used and the fertilized egg implanted into a female of either species.

References

 
 

Macropods
Mammal hybrids
Intergeneric hybrids